Junta General de Caciques was a Mapuche-Huilliche organization active in Futahuillimapu between 1936 and 1985. The organization had its roots in the Parliament of Las Canoas held between Mapuche-Huilliche and Spanbish colonial authorities in 1793. The organization insisted in that apo ülmen should be considered local authorities.

References

Mapuche organizations
Indigenous organisations in Chile
Indigenous rights organizations in South America
1936 establishments in Chile
1985 disestablishments in Chile
Huilliche history